The Journal of Plankton Research is a bimonthly peer-reviewed scientific journal covering research on plankton. It is published by Oxford University Press and the editor-in-chief is John R. Dolan (Centre national de la recherche scientifique). According to the Journal Citation Reports, the journal has a 2018 impact factor of 2.209.

References

External links

Editor ORCID page
 https://orcid.org/0000-0002-9454-1355
JPR Facebook page
 https://www.facebook.com/JournalPlanktonResearch

Oxford University Press academic journals
Bimonthly journals
Biology journals
English-language journals
Publications established in 1979
Planktology